Pierre Colmez (born 1962) is a French mathematician, notable for his work on p-adic analysis.

Colmez studied at École Normale Supérieure and obtained his doctorate from Grenoble University. He won the 2005 Fermat Prize for his contributions to the study of L-functions and p-adic Galois representations.

In 1998 he was an Invited Speaker of the International Congress of Mathematicians in Berlin. With Jean-Pierre Serre he edited the Correspondance Grothendieck-Serre  (2001).

Colmez has won the French Go championship four times.

Mathematical work
He works on special values of L-functions and -adic representations of -adic groups at the meeting point of Fontaine's and Langlands' programs. His contributions include:

 A proof of a -adic analog of Dirichlet's analytic class number formula.
 A proof of Perrin-Riou's conjectural explicit reciprocity law related to the functional equation of -adic L-functions.
 Comparison theorems for -adic algebraic and analytic varieties with applications to a geometrization of the -adic local Langlands correspondence.

Personal life
Pierre Colmez and Leila Schneps are the parents of Coralie Colmez. Violinist David Grimal is Colmez's first cousin.

External links
Pierre Colmez' website

References

Living people
École Normale Supérieure alumni
20th-century French mathematicians
21st-century French mathematicians
University of Paris alumni
1962 births
French Go players
Arithmetic geometers